The Fury of the Wolfman, aka  Wolfman Never Sleeps, is a 1970 Spanish horror film that is the fourth in a long series about the werewolf Count Waldemar Daninsky, played by Paul Naschy. Naschy wrote the screenplay as well. The film was shot in early 1970. It was not theatrically released in Spain until 1975 due to problems involved in finding a distributor, although it was distributed in edited form on U.S. TV in 1974. 

A Swedish edit called Wolfman Never Sleeps has a longer running time and contains several extra nude sex scenes that were edited out of the regular version. Romana Gonzalez handled the werewolf makeup effects.  Naschy had a very hard time working with the director Jose Maria Zabalza, who he said was usually drunk on the set and tampered enormously with Naschy's screenplay. There are claims that Zabalza even had his 14-year-old son help him to direct the film. When the film wound up being too short, Zabalza filmed a few additional werewolf sequences with another (uncredited) actor in the Wolfman costume to pad out the running time, and even spliced in footage from Naschy's 1968 La Marca del Hombre Lobo. 

This was the first film to involve a Yeti as the means of transforming Waldemar into a werewolf (a similar "Yeti origin" appearing again years later in La Maldicion de la Bestia in 1975).  Naschy's original werewolf film had him being transformed into a lycanthrope via the bite of another werewolf (Imre Wolfstein). 

Naschy followed this film up with his 1970 landmark cult classic La Noche de Walpurgis, which many film historians consider the film that started the Spanish horror boom of the seventies.

Plot
College professor Waldemar Daninsky travels to Tibet on an expedition and is bitten by a yeti, which causes him to become a werewolf. Upon hisd arrival home, he discovers his wife has taken a lover in his absence. After transforming into a werewolf, he murders the two of them, but he is accidentally killed in a car accident while trying to escape the murder scene. He is later revived to life by a female scientist, Dr. Ilona Ellmann, who uses her mind control experiments to control him. Daninsky later discovers her underground asylum populated by the bizarre subjects of her failed experiments. 

The crazed lady scientist chains Waldemar to a wall in her lab and beats him mercilessly with a whip. Then she revives Waldemar's murdered ex-wife, who also becomes a werewolf (because she was fatally bitten by Daninsky), and forces the two werewolves to fight. Waldemar kills his wife for the second time, then kills Dr. Ellman by biting her on the throat. He is in turn shot to death by the doctor's young assistant Karin, a woman who loves him enough to end his torment.

Cast
 Paul Naschy as Waldemar Daninsky/Wolfman
 Perla Cristal as Dr. Ilona Ellman/Eva Wolfstein
 Verónica Luján as Karin, Ilona's assistant
 Pilar Zorrilla as Erika Daninsky, Waldemar's former wife 
 Miguel de la Riva as Deputy Wilhelm Kaufmann
 José Marco as Merrill
 Mark Stevens as Bill Williams, a reporter
 Alfredo Santacruz as Rector, Erika's boyfriend 
 Francisco Amorós as Helmut Wolfstein, Ilona's husband 
 Javier de Rivera as Detective
 Ramón Lillo as Frederick
 Fabián Conde as Ilona's henchman 
 Victoria Hernandez as Dr. Ellman's assistant

Production
The plot of this film differed from the earlier entries in the Hombre Lobo series in that 1) Daninsky is a college professor in this film, 2) his lycanthropy is caused by a Yeti's bite, and 3) Daninsky is married in this film. Naschy's friend Enrique Lopez Eguiluz started out to direct this film, but only managed to film Naschy's nightmare dream sequence at the beginning of the film. He left the project early and was replaced by Jose Maria Zabalza, whom Naschy said was an alcoholic and a very uncouth person. Due to the laziness of director Zabalza, this film wound up including a lot of stock footage from La Marca del Hombre Lobo (1968) to pad out its running time and a few carelessly mismatched werewolf scenes played by an anonoymous stunt double he hired without informing Naschy.

Release
Although the film was made in 1970, it was only released theatrically (edited) in Spain and Argentina in 1975; it was sold directly to TV in the U.S. in 1974 (in somewhat edited form). 

The film is today readily available on DVD. Most versions of the film are censored. The only unedited version of the film is the one titled Wolfman Never Sleeps (which was the Swedish print).

Reception
One review states, "Add to the total fiasco of the script & the additionial (sic) confusion caused by bad translation, worse dub, and a multitude of edits of two versions (one version having a lot of nudity), and it's surprising that any sense can be made of it at all."

References

External links

1972 films
1970s monster movies
Spanish werewolf films
1970s Spanish-language films
1972 horror films
Films directed by José María Zabalza
Waldemar Daninsky series